Monalazone, used as monalazone disodium (the disodium salt) and sold under the brand names Naclobenz-Natrium, Spergisin, and Speton, is a vaginal disinfectant or antiseptic and spermicidal contraceptive. It is a sulfonylbenzoic acid derivative and is closely related structurally to halazone. The compound was synthesized in 1937. A vaginal tablet combination of 0.125 mg estradiol benzoate and 10 mg monalazone was previously marketed under the brand name Malun 25.

References

Abandoned drugs
Antiseptics and disinfectants
Benzoic acids
Organochlorides
Spermicide
Sulfamates